Kristi Boxx and Abigail Guthrie were the defending champions, but neither player chose to participate this year.

The wildcard pairing of Madison Brengle and Alexa Glatch won the tournament, defeating Anna Tatishvili and Ashley Weinhold in the all-American final, 6–0, 7–5.

Seeds

Draw

References 
 Draw

USTA Tennis Classic of Macon - Doubles